Anil Malnad (12 October 1957 – 19 March 2018) was an Indian editor who worked in over 200 films across Telugu, Tamil and Odia languages. He won the National Film Award for Best Editing for the Telugu film Sitaara (1984).

Biography
Malnad was born as G. R. Dattatreya in Malnad, Karnataka, India. He started his film career as an assistant director with the 1971 Telugu film Sampoorna Ramayanam, directed by Bapu. He later became an editor and made his debut as an editor with Bapu's Vamsa Vruksham (1980).

Malnad lived with his family in Chromepet, Chennai. He died at the age of 66 on 19 March 2018 at a private hospital in Chennai; he was admitted after he suffered a heart attack.

Selected filmography

Telugu

 Vamsa Vruksham (1980)
 Mantri Gari Viyyankudu (1983)
 Sitaara (1984)
 Preminchu Pelladu (1985)
 Anveshana (1985)
 Ladies Tailor (1986)
 Sankeertana (1987)
 Lawyer Suhasini (1987)
 Maharshi (film) (1988)
 Shri Kanakamalaxmi Recording Dance Troupe (1988)
 Chettu Kinda Pleader (1989)
 Swara Kalpana (1989)
 Gopala Rao Gari Abbayi (1989)
 Pelli Pustakam (1991)
 Prema Shikharam (1992)
 Taraka Ramudu (1997)
 Show (2002)

Tamil

 Kizhakku Vaasal (1990)
 Honest Raj (1994)
 Pottu Amman (2000)
 Alli Thandha Vaanam (2001)
 Charlie Chaplin (2002)
 April Maadhathil (2002)
 Pudhukottaiyilirundhu Saravanan (2004)
 Neranja Manasu (2004)
 Maha Nadigan (2004)
 Devathaiyai Kanden (2005)
 Mercury Pookkal (2006)
 Perarasu (2006)
 Kizhakku Kadalkarai Salai (2006)
 Azhagiya Asura (2006)
 Aavi Kumar (2015)

Odia
 Thakura Achanti Chau Bahaku (1990)
 Kotia Manish Gotiye Jaga (1991)
 Naga Panchami (1992)
 Pacheri Uthila Majhi Duaru (1994)
 Sasu Hathakadi Bhauja Bedi (1999)

Hindi
 Pyari Behna (1985)
 Prem Pratigyaa (1989)

Kannada
 Nigooda Rahasya (1990)

English
 Catch Your Mind (2008)

Awards
 1985 - Nandi Award for Best Editor - Alapana

References

External links

1957 births
2018 deaths
Telugu film editors
Tamil film editors
Kannada film editors
Odia film editors
Best Editor National Film Award winners
Film editors from Karnataka
Hindi film editors